

Matches
Scores and results list Ireland's points tally first.

Touring party
 Manager: K.E. Reid 
 Coach: J. Davidson
 Captain: Willie Anderson

Players

References

1988
Rugby union tours of France
1988 rugby union tours
1987–88 in European rugby union
1987–88 in Irish rugby union
1987–88 in French rugby union